Ali Gorzan-e Sofla (also Romanized as ‘Alī Gorzān-e Soflá; also known as ‘Alī Gordān-e Pā’īn, ‘Ali Khurdān, ‘Ali Khurdān Pāīn, ‘Alī Kordān, ‘Alī Korzān-e Pā’īn, ‘Alī Korzān-e Soflá, and Asadābād) is a village in Gamasiyab Rural District, in the Central District of Sahneh County, Kermanshah Province, Iran. At the 2006 census, its population was 476, in 109 families.

References 

Populated places in Sahneh County